Sweet Honey in the Rock: Raise Your Voice is a 2005 television documentary. It was produced by Firelight Media and directed by Stanley Nelson for the PBS series American Masters.

The film chronicles the history, music, and cultural impact of Sweet Honey in the Rock, a Grammy Award-winning African American female a cappella group with musical roots combining jazz, blues and sacred songs of the black church such as spirituals, hymns, and gospel.  The documentary uses concert footage and rehearsals, archival stills, and reflections by ensemble members, as well as interviews with scholars and cultural commentators. It is intended to introduce the viewer to the group's performance style and activism, and "the organization's significance as a national institution".

References

External links
 
 

Documentary films about African Americans
American documentary television films
2005 television films
2005 films
American Masters films
Films directed by Stanley Nelson Jr.
Documentary films about women in music
2005 documentary films
Films about activists
2000s American films